Shih-Ching Tsou is a Taiwan-born film producer, director, and actress. She co-directed the film Take Out (2004) with Sean Baker. She also produced Baker's other films Starlet (2012), Tangerine (2015), The Florida Project (2017) and Red Rocket (2021).

Early life
Born and raised in Taipei, Taiwan. After graduating from Fu Jen Catholic University, Tsou came to New York City for her master's degree in Media Studies at The New School.

Career
Shih-Ching Tsou is a New York City-based film-maker. Tsou's first film Take Out which she co-directed, co-wrote, co-produced with Sean Baker. The film had its world premiere at the Slamdance Film Festival on January 18, 2004, then it went on to screen at the Nashville Film Festival where it won Regal Cinemas Dreammaker Award. It was released in a limited release in the United States on June 6, 2008. In 2009, it was nominated for the Independent Spirit John Cassavetes Award.

Tsou went on to work with Baker on his third film, Starlet, as an executive producer and costume designer. The film had its world premiere at SXSW on March 11, 2012. The film was released in a limited release on September 9, 2012 by Music Box Films. Tsou along with Baker and the ensemble cast were given the Independent Spirit Robert Altman Award in 2013.

Baker and Tsou collaborated again on Tangerine, where she served as a producer on the film as well as the costume designer, art department and additional camera operator, and made her acting debut in the film. It was filmed completely on iPhone 5s. The film had its world premiere at the 2015 Sundance Film Festival on January 23, 2015. The film was released in a limited release by Magnolia Pictures on July 10, 2015.

After Tangerine, Tsou produced Baker's latest feature The Florida Project, the film premiered in the Directors' Fortnight section of the 2017 Cannes Film Festival, and was theatrically released in the United States on October 6, 2017, by A24. It won at least 38 and was nominated for at least 104 awards including an Academy Award for Best Supporting Actor Willem Dafoe.

Tsou is currently working on her second feature, Left Handed Girl, a family drama set in a night market in Taipei, Taiwan.

In November 2020, Variety announced that Baker and Tsou were almost finished filming a feature film called Red Rocket starring Simon Rex in Texas. Red Rocket premiered at the 2021 Cannes Film Festival and has received rave reviews.

Tsou is a programmer for the Slamdance Film Festival and was a member of the jury in 2019.

In 2021, along with other members of the Red Rocket team, she received the Producer Award at the Hamilton Behind the Camera Awards.

Filmography

Film

References

External links 

 
 Shih-Ching Tsou's Talent Guide on FilmIndependent.org

American film directors of Taiwanese descent
Artists from Taipei
Film directors from Taipei
Living people
Fu Jen Catholic University alumni
Taiwanese emigrants to the United States
The New School alumni
Year of birth missing (living people)